Starrcade '94: Triple Threat was the 12th annual Starrcade professional wrestling pay-per-view (PPV) event produced by World Championship Wrestling (WCW). It took place on December 27, 1994, from the Nashville Municipal Auditorium in Nashville, Tennessee. The main event of the show was WCW World Heavyweight Champion Hulk Hogan defending the title against his former friend-turned-rival The Butcher. The show also included Jim Duggan defending the WCW United States Championship against Vader and Johnny B. Badd defending the WCW World Television Championship against Arn Anderson.

Aspersions were cast on the inclusion of The Butcher (Ed Leslie) in the main event, which was seen as a political maneuver on the part of Hulk Hogan (Leslie's real-life best friend). The match was received negatively by industry journalists, with Wade Keller calling it "one of the low points of WCW".

WCW closed in 2001, and all rights to their television and pay-per-view shows – including the Starrcade series – were bought by WWE. In 2015, all WCW pay-per-views were made available on the WWE Network.

Production

Background
From the 1960s to the 1980s, it was tradition for Jim Crockett Promotions (JCP), a member of the National Wrestling Alliance (NWA), to hold major professional wrestling events at Thanksgiving and Christmas, often at the Greensboro Coliseum in Greensboro, North Carolina in the center of JCP's Virginia, North and South Carolina territory. In 1983, JCP created Starrcade as their supercard to continue the Thanksgiving tradition, bringing in wrestlers from other NWA affiliates and broadcasting the show in its territory on closed-circuit television. Starrcade soon became the flagship event of the year for JCP and highlighted their most important feuds and championship matches. In 1987 the show became available by nationwide pay-per-view as were all subsequent Starrcade shows. The Starrcade tradition was continued by World Championship Wrestling (WCW), into which JCP was transformed after it had been sold to Ted Turner in 1988. The 1994 event was the twelfth show to use the Starrcade name and was the first Starrcade to take place in the Nashville Municipal Auditorium in Nashville, Tennessee.

Storylines
The event featured wrestlers from pre-existing scripted feuds and storylines. Wrestlers portrayed villains, heroes, or less distinguishable characters in the scripted events that built tension and culminated in a wrestling match or series of matches.

Event

The Honky Tonk Man was originally advertised for the show, scheduled to challenge Johnny B. Badd for the WCW World Television Championship but was fired by WCW's Eric Bischoff only days prior to the show for refusing to put over Johnny B. Badd. Instead WCW chose Arn Anderson to replace the Honky Tonk Man, wrestling and losing to Johnny. At the time of the show Harlem Heat had won the WCW World Tag Team Championship prior to the show, but the match had not been broadcast on television yet so Harlem  Heat were not announced as the champions nor did they wear the championship belts to the ring, maintaining the illusion that they had not yet won the championship.

Reception
The involvement of The Butcher (Ed Leslie) in the main event of WCW's flagship pay-per-view garnered particular criticism. Stuart Carapola of PWInsider wrote that "Starrcade 1994 saw [Hulk] Hogan defend the WCW World Title against his best friend [Leslie], who leapfrogged over everyone else in WCW despite being badly out of shape and greatly diminished from the wrestler he was." Wade Keller reported that Leslie's main event positioning was viewed as the result of Hogan making "a political move to help a buddy, not doing what was best for business". Keller called the match "awful", "one of the low points of WCW", and a "sharp turn away" from the "good pay-per-view main events" that the company was then known for presenting, while noting that Leslie "wasn't over".

Dave Meltzer awarded the Hogan vs. Butcher match ¾ of a star out of a possible five: no match on the card received a rating higher than 2¼ stars. In reviewing the event, Scott Keith of 411Mania wrote: "Welcome to rock bottom, as Hogan's egomania results in the main event of the biggest WCW show of the year involving [Ed Leslie]." He cautioned viewers to watch at their "own risk", while offering the "strongest recommendation to avoid."

Results

See also
List of WCW pay-per-view events

References

Starrcade
1994 in Tennessee
Events in Nashville, Tennessee
Professional wrestling in Nashville, Tennessee
December 1994 events in the United States
1994 World Championship Wrestling pay-per-view events